Following is a list of municipal presidents of Zapopan, in the Mexican state of Jalisco:

References

Zapopan
Zapopan